Nomadesongar (released 2004 in Oslo, Norway by the label Tylden & Co – GTACD 8263) is a music album with the Norwegian folk singer Lars Klevstrand.

Personnel
Vocals, Guitar – Lars Klevstrand
Vocals – Ingeborg Hungnes
Choir – Ane Carmen Roggen, Benedikte Kruse, Jan-Tore Saltnes & Svein Korshamn
Guitar – Bjørn Klakegg
Keyboards & horns – Rune Klakegg
Bass – Frode Berg
Percussion – Harald Skullerud

Track listing
 «Ordtøke-gåter» (3:10)
 «1981, vinter» (3:21)
 «Ballade» (2:25)
 «Og kanskje I» (2:37)
 «Azteker» (2:41)
 «Liten skopussar» (2:21)
 «Vise om brua i Avignon» (2:58)
 «Emily Dickinson» (2:52)
 «Segn» (3:15)
 «Folkevise» (2:51)
 «Og kanskje II» (1:54)
 «Vinterhuset» (2:28)
 «Voggesong» (4:13)
 «Vise» (2:20)

Credits
RBG - cover design
Leif Johansen - edition (sound design)
Åse-Marie Nesse - lyrics
Henrik Jonsson - mastering
Lars Klevstrand - musical arrangements, production, liner notes
Anne Lise Flavik, Torunn Nilsen - photographes

References

2004 albums
Norwegian folk music
Folk albums by Norwegian artists